Syed Ali Jawad  Zaidi (10 March 1916 – 6 December 2004) was an Indian Urdu poet, scholar, and author of over 80 books in several languages. He was also an Indian independence activist, lawyer and later, a civil servant, but is best known for his work in Urdu literature.

He was an authority on marsiyago poetry of Uttar Pradesh, including the poets Mir Anis and Mirza Ghalib, and wrote on both poetry and prose, including research and analytical works.

He has received several awards for his contributions to literature and other fields.

Early life and education

Zaidi was born in the village Karhan, Uttar Pradesh, then in Azamgarh district (now Mau district) in eastern Uttar Pradesh, the eldest of six children in a zamindar family of Mohammadabad-Gohna, Azamgarh. He was born at his maternal grandfather's home in Karhan.  Belonging to a Saiyid family and being the eldest son in his family, he was sent to the local Arabic madarsa to gain education and proficiency in Islamic theology and religious matters.

When Zaidi was 11 years old, his father died.  His early formal education took place in Mahmudabad, the princely state.  He then graduated from Government Jubilee College, Lucknow and an LLB from Lucknow University).

Indian independence activism

During his graduation and later while doing his LLB, he came into contact with leaders of the Indian independence movement, which he joined in the late 1930s. He wrote revolutionary poetry while he led the student's movement along with other student leaders such as Shankar Dayal Sharma, who later went on to become the president of India.  His poetry drew praise from Sarojini Naidu, and he was subsequently elected as the secretary-general of the All India Student's Federation.  He remained the secretary-general of the All India Students Federation during the Quit India Movement (1942) launched by Mahatma Gandhi.

His poems were proscribed by the British Colonial Government for inciting rebellion against the British Raj. The British government issued an arrest warrant in order to stop him from organising student rallies and mobilising students against the Raj. He continued his work underground, organising students throughout India.  He was later arrested at Nagpur, and was sentenced to jail for anti-British activity and sent to serve his term at the Nagpur Central Prison and later transferred to the Benares Central Jail.

He was laid to rest at the Malka Jahan burial grounds, Lucknow, India, with full state honours provided to an Indian freedom fighter.

Government service

With India's independence, Zaidi ended his active involvement in politics.  He joined the Information Department of the Government of Uttar Pradesh and was a deputy director there until he was inducted into the Indian Information Service and posted to Srinagar.

Although he had taken up Government Service for a full-time job, and chosen that as a career, he remained active in arts and cultural activities in Jammu and Kashmir, organising and conducting the annual Kashmir festival during the summer months.  He was appointed as the secretary general of the Society of Arts and Culture, Government of Jammu and Kashmir.

In the early 1960s he was transferred to Delhi and posted with the Press Information Bureau in Delhi and Mumbai.  His final posting was in Tehran and he retired from active Government service as Joint Director, News Services, All India Radio in August 1978.

Zaidi was a secularist and nationalist. He was a member of the Inder Kumar Gujral Committee for promotion of Urdu.

He also worked as the editor of Naya Daur, an Urdu monthly digest, and Al-Ilm, a monthly published from Mumbai.  Naya Daur ran a series on his memoirs on a monthly basis for a time, as well as a special issue in his memory of Ali Jawad Zaidi (Nov/Dec issue, 2004) after his death.  He also did some translation work (into English) for the Sahitya Akademi.

He travelled extensively in India and abroad, often working with heads of state and other high-ranking officials. He was friends with Darshan Singh of the Sawan Kirpal Ruhani Mission.

Writing career

Throughout his years with the government, Zaidi continued writing. Seven of his books have won State Government Awards. He was the author of over 80 books in Urdu, English, Hindi and Persian. Many of his works are now reference material for research students. He has been the subject of research scholars, and Doctor of Philosophy degrees have been awarded to four students for research done on his life and works.

He was president of the Uttar Pradesh Urdu Academy, Lucknow and as the president of the Zainabbiya Institute of Islamic Studies, Mumbai, and was on the board of Sahitya Akademi, New Delhi and the Sangeet and Natya Akademi, New Delhi and other social, literary and cultural organizations. He was also an advisor to the Government of Uttar Pradesh.

His books are included in the U.S. Library of Congress.

Amongst his notable works are Qasida Nigaran-e-Uttar Pradesh (in 2 Volumes), Uttar Pradesh ke Marsiyago (in 2 Volumes) & Do Adabi School, which have been published in Urdu-speaking Pakistan as well.  These books along with his History of Urdu Literature (English), Mirza Ghalib – Ek Parichay (Hindi), Mir Anis, are unique in their approaches to their subjects.

Zaidi was a member of the progressive Urdu literature movement, other members of which included Ali Sardar Jafri and Kaifi Azmi. His poetic contemporaries included Majaz, Faiz, and Qurratulain Hyder.

He was also a member of the Committee for Promotion of Urdu (appointed by the Government of India Resolution No. F. 15-25/72-L. 1 dated 5 May 1972)

Confined to his home in Lucknow due to poor health and failing eyesight during his last years, he wrote using an amanuensis. He died on 6 December 2004.

Awards
The Government of India conferred on him the Padma Shri in recognition of his contributions to Urdu literature. (1988), He also received a Tamra Patra award for his role in the freedom movement, and the Ghalib award

Other awards included:
 Anis Award in recognition of Expertise on Mir Anis
 Ghalib Award in recognition of Expertise on Mirza Ghalib
 Certificate of Honour presented by The Rotary Club, Lucknow
 Awards presented to his various books by Governments and Literary Organizations are marked in the list of his books below.
In 1987, Zaidi asked government bodies and literary organizations not to consider his works for awards.

The Jawad Memorial Prize was instituted in his remembrance in 2019 for awarding outstanding translations of Urdu works to English.

List of published books

(Books marked by an ‘*’ are award-winning books) authored by Saiyid Ali Jawad Zaidi
Meri Gazalain 					1959	* Poetry
Teesha-e-Awaaz 					1985	   Poetry
Uttar Pradesh Ke Marsiyago					   Research
Do Adbi School					1970	* Critical Analysis
Naath Nigari Uttar Pradesh mein				   Research & analysis
Zabt Shuda Nazmein					   Collection of Proscribed Poems
Urdu Main Qaumi Shairi Ke Sau Saal		1957	   Criticism & analysis
History of Urdu Literature				1993	   Research & Analysis
Mir Anis (Tr. English)				1986	   Biography
Rang-e-sang 					1944	   Poetry
Dayar-e-Sahar 					1960	   Poetry
Naseem-e-Dasht-e-Arzoo 				1980	* Poetry
Inteqhab Ali Jawad Zaidi 				1971	   Poetry
Silsila (Inteqhab) 					1990	   Poetry
Warq Warq Zanjeer					1990	   Poetry
Dhoop Chaaon					1994	   Poetry
Urdu Main Shairi Ke Sau Saal (Muqqadame ke saath)					1981	   Criticism & analysis
Hamari Quami Shairi					   Criticism & analysis 			
Taamiri Adab					1959	* Criticism & analysis
Anwaar-e-Abu Al Kalaam				1959
Hindustan Mein Islami Uloom Ke Marakaz		1972
Fikr-o-Riyaz					1975	* Collection of Muqalaat
Tareekh-e-Adab Urdu Ki	Tadween		1976	   Research
Qasida Nigaran-e-Uttar Pradesh			1978	   Research
Tarrek Adab Ki Tadween (Vol II)			1983	   Research
Do Aadabi Ischool (Revised Edition)		1980	   Critical Analysis
Qasida Nigaran-e-Uttar Pradesh (Vol II)		1983	   Research & analysis
Masnavi Nigari					1985	   Research & analysis
Diwan-e-Ghani					1964	   Research & analysis
Zikr-o-Fikr Ghani					1966	   Silsila Muqalaat
Nasr Nigari Uttar Pradesh Mein				   Research & analysis
Do aadabi Ischool (Pakistan edition)			1988	   Critical Analysis
Hindustan Mein Arabi Ki Taweej				   Research & analysis
Kamal-e-Abu Kalam				1989	   Collection of articles
Mir Anis (Hindi)						   Biography
Ghalib – Ek Parichay (Hindi)			1969	   Biography
Tareek-e-Mushaira					1992	   Research
Malik Ram Ek Mutaalah				1987	   Biography
Islami Taraqqi Pasandi				
Dehalvi Marsiyago – Vol I				1982	* Research & Analysis
Dehalvi Marsiyago – Vol II				1987	* Research & Analysis
Anis Ke Salaam					1981	   Collection
Rubiyaat-e-Anis					1985	   Collection
Mir Anis						1991	   Collection & Short biography
Jadeed Marsiye Ka Baani – Mir Zamir Laknawi
Adbiyaat Kashmiri					1994
Mahatma Gandhi (Urdu)				1986	   Translation from English
Diwan Shams Tabraizi Ki Seer (Urdu)			   Translation from Persian
Islami Para Para
Aap Se Miliye					1963	* Sketches
Humsaaya					1985	   Sketches
Hum Qaabila					1990	   Sketches
Ehl-e-Qaabila						   Sketches
Yaadon Ke Rahguzar					   Memoirs
Nazr							   Collection of articles
Inteqaab-e-Rind, Anthology					1983
Payaam-e-Aazadi					1947
Naghma-e-aazadi (Urdu)				1957	   Collection of Poems
Naghma-e-aazadi (Hindi)				1957	   Collection of Poems
Zaidi ke Tafsare						   Collection
Zaidi Ke Muqadmaat					   Collection
An Experiment in Communication Planning		1970	   Research & Analysis
Lucknow ka dabistan-e-shairi, Urdu Markaz, 1971
Urdu mein Ram Kathan (Research)
Annotations to Gani Kashmiri's poetry collection (Complied by Amin Daraab Kashmiri); J&K Academy of art, culture & languages
Human Interest Stories				1970
Malik Ram Felicitation Volume			1972
The Prophet's Daughter					   Historical Research (Ready but Unpublished)
Urdu Press in Bihar & Bengal			1978	   Research & Analysis
Mortality & Growth in Urdu Press			1978	   Research & Analysis
All India Students Conference, Golden Jubilee Celebrations			1986
A Short History of Student Movement			   Historical Research
Paro						2005	   Long Poem Published by Anwar Zaidi's efforts
Annual Report (1961–62) J&K, Academy of Arts, Culture & Languages		1962	   Report
Report of the I K Gujral Committee for the Promotion of Urdu (In 2 Vols.)		1975	   Report

Zaidi himself has been the subject of research in several publications:

 Ali Jawad Zaidi, by Saikh Abdur Rehman, 1999
 Ali Jawad Zaidi, Hindustan Adab ke Mehmur, Sahitya Acedemy, by Wazahat Hussain Rizvi, 2012
 Naya Daur, Shumara Number-008,009, by Wazahat Hussain Rizvi
 Ali jawad Zaidi aur sheeraza Kashmir (research), presented at Ali Jawad Zaidi - Fun aur shakshiyat; by Dr. Mohd. Rashid Azeez

List of unpublished works
The Prophet's Daughter					   Historical Research (Ready but Unpublished)

Urdu Mein Ramkatha                         Research on the Ramayanas written in the Urdu language

References

External links
 https://www.scribd.com/document/231817656/App-Say-Miley-Pensketches-Ali-Jawad-Zaidi-Dehli-1963 (By Rashid Ashraf)

Internet searches should also include "Ali Javad Zaidi" as some people mistakenly spell the Jawad as Javad.

Recipients of the Padma Shri in literature & education
People from Uttar Pradesh
People from Mau
University of Lucknow alumni
Indian Muslims
1916 births
2004 deaths
Twelvers
Indian Shia Muslims